The Lotus 107 was a Formula One car used by Team Lotus. Designed for the 1992 Formula One season, and used throughout most of 1992, 1993 and part of 1994, it brought in a final, short-lived period of competitiveness for the team in Formula One.

Design
The 107 is attributed to the design work of Chris Murphy and his design team. Murphy joined Lotus after Akira Akagi's arrest and the Leyton House team he owned was thrown into turmoil. Murphy had designed the 1991 car; the 107 looked very similar to his earlier design leading some to say that the new Lotus was simply a rebadged Leyton House. After several seasons spent perfecting the system, the 107 was fitted with active suspension, pioneered by Lotus ten years before.

Unquestionably beautiful the 107 had smooth sweeping lines a world away from the long developed and antiquated Lotus 102D whose heritage can be traced to the 1990 Formula One Season. The installation of the Ford Cosworth HB V8 engines, of a similar - if older - specification to those being used by Benetton, was complete by the unveiling of the car at the 1992 San Marino Grand Prix.

Johnny Herbert liked the car very much, saying it was sublime to drive and responsive to set up changes, but admitted it was not reliable.

Development
With a top notch driving squad of Johnny Herbert and a future double F1 World Champion Mika Häkkinen, the Lotuses were able to bring in some good results: at several races the twin cars were able to run in formation on the tail of the leading pack, at least in the early parts of the races. Reliability was limited. Häkkinen provided Lotus' best showing for several years at the Hungarian Grand Prix where he diced for the final podium position with Gerhard Berger's McLaren. In Portugal he ran as high as second before having to pit for new tyres late in the race. A further potential podium place in Japan was also lost.

Variants 

The car was developed over succeeding seasons into B and C variants, the latter with Mugen-Honda power in place of the Cosworth. As was standard practice at the time, the team employed the active suspension technology that they had introduced to F1 back in 1987 on later variants, but the budget was not enough to make it really work, and besides, it was now far from being a unique capability. According to Alex Zanardi's autobiography My Story,  the focus on this system was to the detriment of other aspects of the car.

The team's financial difficulties dragged it under at the end of 1994. The Lotus 109, the last Formula One car of the team, which ran in the latter part of 1994, was a further derivative of this design.

Complete Formula One results
(key)

2 points scored in 1992 with the Lotus 102D

References

1992 Formula One season cars
1993 Formula One season cars
1994 Formula One season cars
107